Aethes biscana, the reddish aethes, is a species of moth of the  family Tortricidae. It is found in North America, where it has been recorded from Connecticut, Florida, Illinois, Indiana, Kentucky, Maine, Maryland, Massachusetts, New Brunswick, New Jersey, New York, Ohio, Ontario, Pennsylvania, Quebec, South Carolina and Vermont.

The forewings are light brown with several darker lines and markings. The hindwings are shining grey. Adults have been recorded on wing between February and December depending on the location.

References

biscana
Moths described in 1907
Moths of North America